Anarchism in Panama began as an organized movement among immigrant workers, brought to the country to work on the numerous megaprojects throughout its history.

History
The construction of the Panama Canal Railway and the Panama Canal brought a large number of migrant workers to Panama. The construction period that was conducted by the French brought about 20,000 workers into the country, many of whom were anarchists from Europe. The construction period conducted by the United States brought about 40,000 workers from Central America and the Caribbean to the country. It was these workers that first brought anarcho-syndicalism to Panama. The most libertarian workers came from Spain, a country where the anarchist movement was tightly organized and held revolutionary experience. While the railway was under construction, a number of strikes broke out, demanding higher wages and improved working conditions. Strikes erupted again in 1895, led mostly by European anarchists, some of them were even successful.

On June 11, 1904, the Panamanian government passed a law that prohibited entry to anarchist immigrants. In 1905, governor George W. Davis, made an effort to hinder construction work by anarchists. In 1907, 2,000 Spanish workers struck for better wages. Panamanian anarchists organized as a fringe movement within the Federación Obrera, which had been formed by the liberal politician Belisario Porras, where they promoted a tenants’ strike. A number of individualist anarchists, influenced by the philosophies of Nietzsche and Stirner, also arrived in Panama. They saw syndicalism as a potential enemy, due to its organizationalist tendencies, and instead formed several affinity groups for their activities. In 1911 the individualist newspaper El Unico was first published in Colón.

In 1924, a group of anarcho-syndicalists established the Sindicato General de Trabajadores, the first national trade union center in Panama, which attracted thousands of members, including foreign and Panamanian anarchists, as well as the future leaders of the Communist and Socialist parties.

References

Bibliography 

 
Anarchism by country
Anarchism
1890s in Panama